"Everybody's Gotta Pay Some Dues" (Tamla 54048), was a 1961 R&B song by Motown Records group The Miracles released on the label's Tamla Records subsidiary. It was taken from Cookin' with The Miracles, the group's second album, and was written by Miracles members Smokey Robinson and Ronald White. It entered the Billboard Pop and R&B listings that year, and reached #52 and #11 respectively.

Similar to the group's first million-selling hit single, "Shop Around", this song is an "advice" record. Whereas on the earlier tune Smokey, as the song's narrator, received advice from his mama, who told him "You better Shop Around", this time it is Smokey who is giving life's advice to his own son, telling him about the trials and errors in the search to find true love in the song's preface:

If ever I have a son in lifeI'll call him in one day...
And sit him down upon my kneeAnd here is what I'll say....

In his trademark poetic fashion, as the doting father, Smokey continues...

You might lose your lover...People do sometimes...But it won't make sense for you...To sit around cryin'...'''Don't you know that when you fall in love, sometimes...You're gonna have to lose...Well, it may take years, but you're gonna shed some tears...'causeEverybody's Gotta Pay Some Dues.The other Miracles, Bobby, Ronnie, Pete, and Claudette, provide their backing harmonies to punctuate Smokey's vocals on the chorus and elsewhere, using classic call and response vocals on the song's bridge. The song was laden with heavy strings throughout, and was actually, despite its modest chart placing, very important in establishing the Miracles' sound and fan base, proving that they were far from being "one hit wonders". It kept their name on the charts, and Motown's name in the trade papers, (Billboard, Cash Box, etc.). It also established the beginnings of what later came to be known as "The Motown Sound", and featured a level of sophistication not found on previous Miracles' singles releases.

The Miracles' importance to Motown during this earlier period cannot be overstated, as they were the label's first group, and the only act on the label to enjoy a consistent string of chart hit records during the company's critical early years, 1959-1964.

This song was arranged by famed Chicago-based  conductor/arranger Riley C. Hampton. This was the first time an outside arranger was employed on a Motown release.

Ironically, while Everybody's Got to Pay Some Dues was one of The Miracles' best early hits, it is also one of the least acclaimed: only one cover version is known...by fellow Motown artist, Marv Johnson, who recorded a version in 1967. It wasn't even included in the group's first greatest hits album, Greatest Hits from the Beginning. It has, however, since been included in their 35th Anniversary Collection'' box set, and a few other Miracles compilations, including the group's 2009 2 -disc compilation release, The Miracles–Depend On Me: The Early Albums .

Personnel: The Miracles
Smokey Robinson
Claudette Robinson
Bobby Rogers
Pete Moore
Ronnie White
Marv Tarplin

External links
.

References
Everybody's Gotta Pay Some Dues -Song Review-from the "Motown Junkies" website

The Miracles songs
Tamla Records singles
1961 songs
Songs written by Smokey Robinson
Songs written by Ronald White
Song recordings produced by Berry Gordy